Halfmoon Lake is a  water body located in Belknap County in central New Hampshire, United States, in the towns of Barnstead and Alton. The pond is part of the Suncook River watershed, flowing south to the Merrimack River.

The lake is classified as a warmwater fishery, with observed species including largemouth bass, chain pickerel, horned pout, and white perch.

See also

List of lakes in New Hampshire

References

Lakes of Belknap County, New Hampshire